The 2010 World Cup of Pool was the fifth World Cup of Pool championship. It was held at the Robinsons Place Manila in Manila, Philippines, from September 7 to 12, 2010. China won this year's event.

Rules
Winners' break.
Teammates take shots alternately.
Race to eight racks for matches prior to the quarterfinals.
Race to nine racks for matches from the quarterfinals to the semifinals.
Race to ten racks for the Final.
Eighty-second shot clock for the shot immediately after the break, forty seconds for other shots.
In order for a break to be legal, two balls must pass over the head string.

Prize fund

Participating nations

Seeded teams:
 A (Efren Reyes and Francisco Bustamante)
 (Rodney Morris and Johnny Archer)
 B (Roberto Gomez and Dennis Orcollo)
 (Daryl Peach and Karl Boyes)
 B (Ralf Souquet and Oliver Ortmann)
 (Niels Feijen and Huidji See)
 (Ko Pin-yi and Chang Jung-lin)
 (Fu Jian-bo and Li He-wen)
 (Fabio Petroni and Bruno Muratore)
 (Naoyuki Oi and Toru Kuribayashi)
 (Mika Immonen and Markus Juva)
 (John Morra and Jason Klatt)
 (Stephan Cohen and Francois Cottance)
 (David Alcaide and Francisco Sanchez Ruiz)
 (Radosław Babica and Mariusz Skoneczny)
 (Muhammad Zulfikri and Ricky Yang)
Unseeded teams:
 (James Delahunty and Ricky Emery)
 (Mario He and Jasmin Ouschan)
 (Serge Das and Noel Bruynooghe)
 (Carlo Dalmatin and Philipp Stojanovic)
 (Lee Chenman and Kenny Kwok)
 (Raj Hundal and Dharminder Singh Lilly)
 (Yu Ram Cha and Ga Young Kim) 
 (Ibrahim Bin Amir and Lee Poh Soon)
 (Tony Drago and Alex Borg)
 (Mohammad Al Bin Ali and Bashar Hussain)
 (Konstantin Stepanov and Ruslan Chinakhov)
 (Chan Keng Kwang and Toh Lian Han)
 (Matjaz Erculj and Matej Sulek)
 (Marcus Chamat and Thomas Mehtala)
 (Nitiwat Kanjanasri and Surethep Phoochalam)
 (Luong Chi Dung and Do Hoang Quan)

Tournament bracket

References

External links
 Official Site

2010
2010 in cue sports
2010 in Philippine sport
International sports competitions hosted by the Philippines
Sports in Manila
September 2010 sports events in the Philippines